The Apperson was a brand of American automobile manufactured from 1901 to 1926 in Kokomo, Indiana.

Company history
The company was founded by the brothers Edgar and Elmer Apperson shortly after they left Haynes-Apperson; for a time they continued to use a FR layout-mounted flat-twin engine, following it with a horizontal four.

Apperson cars
In 1904, Apperson offered vertical fours in two models.  The 1904 Apperson Touring Car was a touring car model.  Equipped with a tonneau, it could seat 6 passengers and sold for US$6000.  The vertical-mounted straight-4, situated at the front of the car, produced 40 hp (29.8 kW).  A 4-speed transmission was fitted.  The steel-framed car weighed 2800 lb (1270 kg). The wheel base was 96 inches. The Apperson offered electric lights, a novelty for the time, and used a modern cellular radiator.  The 25 hp (18.6 kW) version weighed 1800 lb (816 kg) and sold for US$3500.

In 1906 the company cataloged a 95 hp (71 kW) four at $10,500.  The next year the first of the famed Jackrabbit speedsters rolled off the line; this was a 60 hp (45 kW) that sold for $5000.  For a time, the entire range was known as the "Jack Rabbit" - in 1913 a 32.4 hp (24 kW) four and a 33.7 hp (25 kW) six were listed, and a 33.8 hp (25 kW) 90-degree V-8 of 5.5 L (5502 cc/335 in3) followed in 1914.

Roadplane models introduced
In 1916 the company announced production of the "Roadplane" six and eights.  The term "Roadplane" did not refer to a specific model but was a marketing concept devised by Elmer Apperson that was applied to the "Chummy Roadster" and the "Touring" car.  Elmer took the unusual step of patenting the "Chummy Roadster" design (see:"U.S. Patent 48359").

The "Silver-Apperson", designed by Conover T. Silver, was launched in 1917; the model was known as the "Anniversary" after 1919.  A sedan proprietary with six cylinders of 3.2 L (3243 cc/197 in3) appeared in 1923, and a Lycoming eight-cylinder was offered beginning in 1924.

Final production
By 1924, Apperson and Haynes were both losing sales; a rumored remarriage came to naught, and Apperson folded for good despite the introduction of four-wheel brakes on the 1926 models.

Apperson production models
 Apperson Six Sport Sedan

References

 Frank Leslie's Popular Monthly (January, 1904)
 Madden, W.C. (2003) Haynes-Apperson and America's first practical automobile : a history,  Jefferson, N.C. ; London : McFarland & Co., 

Motor vehicle manufacturers based in Indiana
Defunct motor vehicle manufacturers of the United States
Companies based in Kokomo, Indiana
1900s cars
1910s cars
1920s cars
Brass Era vehicles
Vehicle manufacturing companies established in 1902
Vehicle manufacturing companies disestablished in 1926
1902 establishments in Indiana
1926 disestablishments in Indiana
Defunct companies based in Indiana